Sindang-dong is a dong, neighbourhood of Jung-gu in Seoul, South Korea.

Attractions
The neighbourhood is near Sindang Station and is approximately two blocks from exit 8. It is a popular shopping area with a variety of food markets, and eateries that specialise in Korean snacks such as Ddeokbokki. It is known to Koreans for its Ddeokbokki Town.

Transportation 

See also
Administrative divisions of South Korea

References

External links
 Jung-gu Official site in English
 Jung-gu Official site
 Jung-gu Tour Guide from the Official site
 Status quo of Jung-gu 
 Resident offices and maps of Jung-gu 
 Sindang 1-dong resident office website

Neighbourhoods of Jung-gu, Seoul